Okulovka is the name of several inhabited localities in Russia.

Urban localities
Okulovka (town), Novgorod Oblast, a town in Okulovsky District of Novgorod Oblast; administratively incorporated as a town of district significance

Rural localities
Okulovka, Arkhangelsk Oblast, a village in Solvychegodsky Selsoviet of Kotlassky District of Arkhangelsk Oblast
Okulovka (rural locality), Novgorod Oblast, a village under the administrative jurisdiction of the town of district significance of Okulovka in  Okulovsky District of Novgorod Oblast
Okulovka, Perm Krai, a village in Okhansky District of Perm Krai